Theodor Herzl or Theodor Herzl, Standard-Bearer of the Jewish People (German: Theodor Herzl, der Bannerträger des jüdischen Volkes) is a 1921 Austrian silent drama film directed by Otto Kreisler and starring Ernst Bath, Rudolph Schildkraut and Joseph Schildkraut. It portrays the life of Theodor Herzl, the pioneer of modern Zionism.

Cast
 Ernst Bath as Theodor Herzl
 Rudolph Schildkraut as Das ringende Israel 
 Joseph Schildkraut as Das leidende Israel 
 Josef Schreiter as Prophet 
 Rudolf Dietz as Dr. Samuel Goldblatt 
 Else Osterheim as eine junge russische Jüdin 
 Gita Lenart-Vago as eine spanische Jüdin 
 Axel Plessen as russischer Gutsbesitzer 
 Pippa Gettke as Altjüdische tänzerin 
 Heinz Altringen as König von Spanien 
 Ludwig Donath as Prinz Eugen 
 Eugen Preiß as Pope Leo XIII

References

Bibliography
 Holmes, Deborah & Silverman, Lisa. Interwar Vienna: Culture Between Tradition and Modernity. Camden House, 2009.
 Dassanowsky, Robert. Austrian Cinema: A History. McFarland & Company Incorporated Publishing, 2005.

External links

1921 films
1920s historical films
1920s biographical films
Austrian historical films
Austrian biographical films
Austrian silent feature films
Films directed by Otto Kreisler
Films set in the 1890s
Films set in the 1900s
Films about Jews and Judaism
Austrian black-and-white films
Films set in Austria-Hungary